The 2018–19 1. FC Köln season was the 71st season in the football club's history and 1st consecutive and 9th overall season in the second flight of German football, the 2. Bundesliga, having been relegated from the Bundesliga in 2018. In addition to the domestic league, 1. FC Köln also participated in this season's edition of the domestic cup the DFB-Pokal. This was the 71st season for Köln in the RheinEnergieStadion, located in Cologne, North Rhine-Westphalia, Germany. The season covered a period from 1 July 2018 to 30 June 2019.

Competitions

Overview

2. Bundesliga

League table

Results summary

Results by round

Matches

DFB-Pokal

Statistics

Appearances and goals

|-
! colspan=14 style=background:#dcdcdc; text-align:center| Goalkeepers

|-
! colspan=14 style=background:#dcdcdc; text-align:center| Defenders

|-
! colspan=14 style=background:#dcdcdc; text-align:center| Midfielders

|-
! colspan=14 style=background:#dcdcdc; text-align:center| Forwards

|-
! colspan=14 style=background:#dcdcdc; text-align:center| Players transferred out during the season
|-

References

1. FC Köln seasons
Köln, 1. FC